Amanda Blank (born Amanda Mallory McGrath; March 21, 1983) is an American singer, rapper and member of the performance art band Sweatheart based in Philadelphia.

Early life
Amanda Blank was born in Germantown, a neighborhood in northwest Philadelphia, Pennsylvania in 1983. Amanda and her older sisters were raised in a row house in Germantown by artist parents. Blank based her stage name on Strangers with Candy character, Jerri Blank, played by Amy Sedaris.

Career
She frequently collaborates with rapper Spank Rock, most notably on the track "Blow" on the mix CD Bmore Gutter Music and later "Bump" on the album YoYoYoYoYo, released in 2006. Her songs have appeared in HBO's Life Support and the CSI: NY episode  "Buzzkill". In 2007, she was featured on the official Eli Escobar and Doug Grayson remix for Britney Spears's hit single "Gimme More". In early 2008, Blank was described as being part of "a new crop of young, multicultural, female hip-hop acts in the wake of MIA causing a stir on the internet and in indie-label conference rooms." Blank's song "Supafreak" appeared in the movie Observe and Report in 2009. She was featured on the song "Loose" on the Spank Rock and Benny Blanco are Bangers & Cash EP, which appeared in the ABC show Castle episode "Lucky Stiff". Blank's song "Make It Take It" appeared in a commercial for McDonald's in 2010.

Blank signed to Downtown Records in 2007. Her first solo album, "I Love You", was produced by XXXChange of Spank Rock, Diplo, and Dave Sitek in August 2009, with her first single being "Might Like You Better". The album received a strongly negative review from Pitchfork, which described it as akin to "Lady Gaga minus the tunes, ambition, or sense of purpose." Others were more positive, with Billboard describing it as "guiltless fun, just like any proper quickie."

Amanda Blank has opened for Canadian electroclash musician Peaches, the Yeah Yeah Yeahs, and label mate Santigold.

On May 16, 2019, she released a song called "Put Me Out." In 2020, she had a feature in the track "WooWooWoo", on Spank Rock's album Startisha.

Personal life

Blank is currently in a relationship with Arctic Monkeys drummer, Matt Helders.

Discography

Albums
2005: Bmore Gutter Music (Mix CD)
2006: Blow (EP)
2009: I Love You
TBA: The Ruiner

Singles
2009: "Might Like You Better"
2009: "Shame on Me"
2019: "Put Me Out"
2020: "Oh Man"
2021: "Love You Again"

Other
Get It Now 12"
Supafreak"

Featuring work
"Foul Mouth" – on Dimensional People LP (with Mouse on Mars)
"Quicksand (Mad Decent 2010 Rerub)"- (with Major Lazer)
"A Volta" –  feat. Sizzla and Lovefoxxx, on The Spirit of Apollo LP (with NASA)
"Bump" – 12" (with Spank Rock)
"Extraball" –  on the Away from the Sea LP (with Yuksek)Lindsay Lohan's Revenge – 12" (with Pase Rock)Supahead – (Wowo Bmore Gutter Music)Loose – 12" (with Bangers & Cash)Pillowface and His Airplane Chronicles – (with Spank Rock)Sexy Motherfucker – 12" (with Pase Rock)Blow Remix EP – (with Aaron LaCrate, 45 King, Dj Equalizer, Debonair Samir)YoYoYoYoYo – (with Spank Rock)Startisha - (with Spank Rock)Bmore Gutter Music'' – (with Aaron LaCrate, Low Budget, Spank Rock)
"What U Like" – (with Major Lazer)
"Love Thing Part 3 (Only you)" – On Eli Escobar's "Love thing" LP
"Psycho Killa"  – On The '87 Stick Up Kids "Car Keys & Rabbit Feet" LP

References

External links
 

American women rappers
Living people
Rappers from Philadelphia
1982 births
21st-century American rappers
21st-century American women musicians
21st-century women rappers